This is a list of visitors of the constituent colleges of the University of Cambridge.

Notes

Statute B.(3): "When the office of Chancellor is vacant the powers of the Visitor shall be vested in the Vice-Chancellor of the University provided that he is not a member of the College."

Statute .1: "There shall be a Visitor of the College who shall be appointed by the Governing Body from
those who hold or who have held high judicial office."

Statute 2.4: "Any other duty assigned by these statutes to the Visitor, except that of interpreting the statutes, may at the Visitor’s request be discharged by the Vice-Chancellor of the University, provided that the Vice-Chancellor is not a member of the College."

Statute .2: "The Visitor of the College shall be the Lord Chief Justice of England."

Supplemental Charter 28 July 1971: "…there shall always be a Visitor of the College elected by the Governing Body…"

Statute .2: "The Visitor of the College shall be the Chancellor of the University if he will consent to act. In case of his refusal the Visitor shall be elected by the Governing Body."

Ordinance 3.1(4): "If no person has been elected to fill a vacancy in the Visitorship at the expiration of six months from the occurrence of a vacancy, the power of electing a person to fill the vacancy shall devolve on the Chancellor of the University."

Statute 2.: "The Visitor shall be elected by the Governing Body."

Statute A.1: "…the Visitor of the College shall be the Viscount De L’Isle of Penshurst in the County of Kent, being the representative of the Sidney Family."

References

Visitors